Boogie 2nite is the debut and only album by the English duo Booty Luv, released on 17 September 2007 in the United Kingdom by Hed Kandi. The album went straight onto the charts at number eleven, and has since sold over 70,000 copies in the UK, being certified silver by the BPI. It was possible to pre-order signed copies of the album directly from the Ministry of Sound website.

The album contains Booty Luv's four hit singles (two top ten, two top twenty), five cover versions, and seven original tracks co-written by the two members themselves. In addition, there is an interactive component on the album which takes you to a website where you enter your details and can then watch the videos for the singles and a six-minute making-of special on the "Don't Mess with My Man" single.

On 5 August 2008 Boogie 2nite was released in the United States, containing the original twelve tracks, an exclusive bonus remix of "Shine" and a new colour scheme for the cover art (blue and green). They are currently being managed and promoted by their manager and biggest fan, Kris Toffer.

Track listing 
 "Boogie 2nite" (John Smith, Charlene Keys, Nisan Stewart) – 3:16
 "Shine" (James Harris III, Terry Lewis, Bernard Edwards, Nile Rodgers) – 3:25
 "Don't Mess with My Man" (Raphael Saadiq, Ali Shaheed Muhammad, Conesha Owens, Dawn Robinson) – 2:55
 "Some Kinda Rush" (Nadia Shepherd, Cherise Roberts, Carl Ryden, Samantha Powell) – 3:31
 "Dance Dance" (Shepherd, Roberts, Ryden, Costandia Costi) – 3:07
 "Be Without You" (Mary J. Blige, Johnta Austin, Bryan-Michael Cox, Jason Perry) – 3:40
 "Who's That Girl" (Shepherd, Roberts, Ryden, Powell) – 3:03
 "Good Girl's Gone Bad" (Diane Warren) – 2:34
 "A Little Bit" (Jade Ewen, Cherise Leachman, Kenisha Pratt, Frederik Tao Nordsø Schjoldan, Azi Jegbefume Shalit) – 3:12
 "He's a Winner" (Shepherd, Roberts, Ryden, Powell) – 3:15
 "Something to Talk About" (Shepherd, Roberts, Ryden, Powell) – 3:23
 "Where You Are" (Rahsaan Patterson, Jamey Jaz) – 4:08

Bonus tracks
 "Boogie 2nite" (DB Boulevard Edit)
 "Shine" (M's Smooth '54 Edit)
 "Don't Mess with My Man" (Ryden's Live Edit)
 "Some Kinda Rush" (Ryden's Live Edit) (iTunes bonus track)
 "Shine" (Passengerz Club Mix) (U.S. bonus track)

Covers 
 "Boogie 2nite – Tweet cover
 "Shine – Luther Vandross cover
 "Don't Mess with My Man" – Lucy Pearl cover
 "Be Without You" – Mary J. Blige cover
 "Where You Are" – Rahsaan Patterson cover

Charts

Certifications

References

2007 debut albums
Booty Luv albums